Zscheiplitz is a village in the southern part of Saxony-Anhalt, Germany, and includes a former Benedictine Monastery.

Geography
The village lies on the Unstrut river, in the municipality of Freyburg, to the north-west of Naumburg, and so in the Verwaltungsgemeinschaft of Unstruttal, in the southern part of Saxony-Anhalt.

References

Former municipalities in Saxony-Anhalt
Freyburg, Germany